Basurmanovka (Bohorman) is a rural locality (a village) and the administrative centre of Abitovsky Selsoviet, Meleuzovsky District, Bashkortostan, Russia. The population was 202 as of 2010. There are 3 streets.

Geography 
Basurmanovka is located 27 km east of Meleuz (the district's administrative centre) by road. Kutlubulatovo is the nearest rural locality.

References 

Rural localities in Meleuzovsky District